Brian Emanuel Gómez (born 15 February 1994) is an Argentine footballer who plays as a winger for Primera Nacional side Temperley.

Career 
Gómez began his career at Argentinos Juniors, where he made only two appearances.

He went on to join Estudiantes de Buenos Aires, where he made 46 appearances, scoring twice.

He then made 65 league appearances for Brown de Adrogué across three seasons. He scored nine goals.

On 28 March 2019, he joined USL Championship side San Antonio FC for the 2019 season.

References

Living people
1994 births
Association football forwards
Argentine footballers
Argentine expatriate footballers
Sportspeople from Buenos Aires Province
Argentinos Juniors footballers
Estudiantes de Buenos Aires footballers
C.D. Feirense players
San Antonio FC players
Club Atlético Brown footballers
Lincoln Red Imps F.C. players
Club Atlético Temperley footballers
Primera Nacional players
Primera B Metropolitana players
Argentine Primera División players
Primeira Liga players
USL Championship players
Argentine expatriate sportspeople in Portugal
Argentine expatriate sportspeople in the United States
Argentine expatriate sportspeople in Gibraltar
Expatriate footballers in Portugal
Expatriate soccer players in the United States
Expatriate footballers in Gibraltar